This is a list of diplomatic missions in Armenia. There are currently 36 embassies resident in Yerevan. Several other countries have accredited embassies outside Armenia.

Embassies in Yerevan

Other posts in Yerevan 
 (Representative Office)
 (Office)
 (Delegation)
 (Information Office)
 (Office)

Consular missions

Gyumri 
 (Consulate-General)

Kapan 
 (Consulate-General)

Honorary consulates

Honorary Consulates in Yerevan

Honorary Consulates in Gyumri

Honorary Consulates in Vanadzor

Honorary Consulates in Yeghegnadzor

Non-resident embassies accredited to Armenia 
Resident in Moscow otherwise noted.

Embassies to open
Future embassies to open, include:

Multilateral organizations in Yerevan
Several Multilateral organizations also maintain representation in Yerevan, including:
Asian Development Bank
Assembly of European Regions

Eurasian Development Bank
European Bank for Reconstruction and Development
International Monetary Fund

Swiss Agency for Development and Cooperation

United States Agency for International Development
 
The World Bank

See also 
 Foreign relations of Armenia
 International Organizations in Armenia
 List of diplomatic missions of Armenia
 Visa requirements for Armenian citizens
 Visa policy of Armenia

References

External links
 Ministry of Foreign Affairs of Armenia	
 Embassies in Armenia
 Consulates in Armenia

 
Armenia
Diplomatic missions